Kirsty Williams is a radio drama director and producer for BBC Radio Drama at Pacific Quay, Glasgow.

Plays written by Oliver Emanuel that she directed have received several awards: Daniel and Mary received a Bronze Sony Radio Academy Award for Best Drama in 2010,  A History of Paper was shortlisted for the Tinniswood Award 2017, When The Pips Stop won the Tinniswood Award in 2019, and The Truth About Hawaii won the BBC Audio Drama Award for Best Original Series or Serial in 2019.

Radio Plays

Notes:

References

BBC Radio drama directors
BBC radio producers
Living people
Scottish drama
British radio directors
Women radio directors
BBC Scotland
Scottish radio producers
Year of birth missing (living people)
Women radio producers